Windtech Parapentes is a Spanish aircraft manufacturer based in Gijón and founded in 1994. The company specializes in the design and manufacture of paragliders in the form of ready-to-fly aircraft, as well as rescue parachutes.

By the mid-2000s the company had established a complete line of paragliders, including the two-place tandem Bantoo and the beginner Coral for flight training, the beginner to intermediate Tonic, the sports intermediate Pulsar, the advanced intermediate Quarx, the advanced cross country Syncro and the competition Nitro glider.

Aircraft 

Summary of aircraft built by Windtech Parapentes:
Windtech Altair
Windtech Ambar
Windtech Arial
Windtech Bali
Windtech Bantoo
Windtech Cargo
Windtech Combat
Windtech Coral
Windtech Evo
Windtech Fenix
Windtech Honey
Windtech Impulse
Windtech Kali
Windtech Kinetik
Windtech Loop
Windtech Nitro
Windtech Pulsar
Windtech Quarx
Windtech Ru-bi
Windtech Serak
Windtech Silex
Windtech Spiro
Windtech Syncro
Windtech Tactic
Windtech Tecno
Windtech Tempest
Windtech Tempus
Windtech Tonic
Windtech Tuareg
Windtech Tucan
Windtech Windy
Windtech Zenith
Windtech Zephyr

References

External links

Aircraft manufacturers of Spain
Paragliders
Spanish companies established in 1994
Spanish brands